Keeranur is a village in the Kumbakonam taluk of Thanjavur district, Tamil Nadu, India.

Demographics 

As per the 2001 census, Keeranur had a total population of 1410 with 714 males and 696 females. The sex ratio was 975. The literacy rate was 78.61

References 

 

Villages in Thanjavur district